Kameshkan (also Romanized as Kāmeshkān, Kāmeshgān, and Kāmeskān; also known as Kameshan and Kāshgān) is a village in Hesar-e Valiyeasr Rural District, Central District, Avaj County, Qazvin Province, Iran. At the 2006 census, its population was 86, in 31 families.

References 

Populated places in Avaj County